Robert Stryvelyne (fl. 1414–1421) of Chichester, Sussex, was an English politician.

He was a Member (MP) of the Parliament of England for Chichester in November 1414, 1417 and 1421.

References

14th-century births
15th-century deaths
English MPs November 1414
People from Chichester
English MPs 1417
English MPs May 1421